Wolfire Games is an American independent video game development company founded by David Rosen. Wolfire Games develops video games for macOS, Windows, and Linux.

History 
David Rosen founded Wolfire Games in 2003 to organize his open source video game contest entries. After graduating from Swarthmore College in 2008, he was joined by his twin brother, Jeff, and two friends. In 2010, Wolfire ran the first Humble Bundle, later spun off as a separate company.

The company was awarded 5th Best Indie Game for their game Overgrowth by ModDB during the 7th Annual Mod of the Year Awards.

The company operates a YouTube channel on which it releases game footage and highlights new features.

The company name was inspired by "Wolfenstein", a stray dog the Rosen brothers adopted in 1996 and named for the video game series.

Games 
GLFighters – 2001 – Mac OS 9
Black Shades
Black Shades – 2002 – Linux, Mac OS 9, Mac OS X, Windows
Black Shades iPhone – 2009 – iPhone
Lightning's Shadow – 2003 – Mac OS 9
Lugaru – 2005 – Linux, Mac OS X, Windows
The Broadside Express – 2012 – Linux, Mac OS X, Windows (developed for the Humble Bundle Mojam using the Unity game engine)
Receiver – 2012 – Linux, Mac OS X, Windows (developed for the 2012 7dfps challenge using the Unity game engine)
Desperate Gods – 2012 – Mac OS X, Windows (developed for the 2012 Fuck This Jam challenge using the Unity game engine. Updates will continue after the challenge)
Low-light Combat – 2013 – Linux, Mac OS X, Windows (developed for the Humble Bundle Mojam 2 using the Unity game engine)
Overgrowth – 2017 – Windows, macOS, Linux
Receiver II – 2020 – Windows, macOS, Linux

See also 
 Humble Indie Bundle

References

External links 
 
 Blog
 Forums

American companies established in 2003
Video game companies based in California
Indie video game developers
Video game development companies
Software companies based in the San Francisco Bay Area
Video game companies established in 2003
2003 establishments in California
Privately held companies based in California